Perth Glory Football Club is an Australian professional association football club based in East Perth, Perth. The club was formed in 1995 and has played at its current home ground, Perth Oval, since its inception. The club played its first competitive match in the first round of the 1996–97 National Soccer League, in October 1996. Perth is one of the three National Soccer League clubs from the 2003–04 season that were implemented into the A-League Men for the inaugural 2005–06 season, and has since participated in every A-League Men season.

The list encompasses the honours won by Perth Glory, records set by the club, their managers and their players. The player records section itemises the club's leading goalscorers and those who have made most appearances in first-team competitions. It also records notable achievements by Perth Glory players on the international stage, and the highest transfer fees paid and received by the club. Attendance records at Lord Street, the Perth Oval, the club's home ground since 1996, and other temporary home grounds, such as Arena Joondalup in 2003, are also included.

Perth Glory have won six top-flight titles. The club's record appearance maker is Jamie Harnwell, who made 269 appearances between 1998 and 2011. Bobby Despotovski is Perth Glory's record goalscorer, scoring 116 goals in total.

All figures are correct as of 2 January 2023.

Honours and achievements

Domestic
 National Soccer League (until 2004) and A-League Men Premiership
 Winners (4): 1999–2000, 2001–02, 2003–04, 2018–19
 Runners-up (1): 2002–03

 National Soccer League (until 2004) and A-League Men Championship
 Winners (2): 2002–03, 2003–04
 Runners-up (4): 1999–2000, 2001–02, 2011–12, 2018–19

 Australia Cup
 Runners-up (2): 2014, 2015

 A-League Pre-Season Challenge Cup
 Runners-up (2): 2005, 2007

Player records

Appearances
 Most league appearances: Jamie Harnwell, 256
 Youngest first-team player: Daniel De Silva, 15 years, 361 days (against Sydney FC, A-League Men, 2 March 2013)
 Oldest first-team player: Ante Covic, 40 years, 309 days (against Melbourne City, A-League Men Finals, 17 April 2016)
 Most consecutive appearances: Danny Vukovic, 80 (from 9 October 2011 to 22 February 2014)

Most appearances
Competitive matches only, includes appearances as substitute. Numbers in brackets indicate goals scored.

a. Includes the National Soccer League and A-League Men.
b. Includes the A-League Pre-Season Challenge Cup and Australia Cup
c. Includes goals and appearances (including those as a substitute) in the 2005 Australian Club World Championship Qualifying Tournament.

Goalscorers
 Most goals in a season: Damian Mori, 24 (in the 2002–03 season)
 Most league goals in a season: Damian Mori, 24 (in the 2002–03 season)
 Youngest goalscorer: Daniel De Silva, 17 years, 237 days (against Melbourne Victory, Australia Cup, 29 October 2014)
 Oldest goalscorer: Diego Castro, 38 years, 325 days (against Macarthur FC, A-League Men, 23 May 2021)

Top goalscorers
Competitive matches only. Numbers in brackets indicate appearances made.

a. Includes the National Soccer League and A-League Men.
b. Includes the A-League Pre-Season Challenge Cup and Australia Cup
c. Includes goals and appearances (including those as a substitute) in the 2005 Australian Club World Championship Qualifying Tournament.

Award winners

Johnny Warren Medal

The following players have won the Johnny Warren Medal while playing for Perth Glory:
  Damian Mori – 2002–03
  Bobby Despotovski – 2005–06
  Diego Castro – 2015–16

Joe Marston Medal

The following players have won the Joe Marston Medal while playing for Perth Glory:
 Simon Colosimo – 2003
 Jacob Burns – 2012

Harry Kewell Medal

The following players have won the Harry Kewell Medal while playing for Perth Glory:
 Nikita Rukavytsya – 2008–09
 Chris Ikonomidis – 2018–19

Young Footballer of the Year

The following players have won the A-League Men Young Footballer of the Year award while playing for Perth Glory:
 Nick Ward – 2005–06
 Chris Ikonomidis – 2018–19

Golden Boot

The following players have won the Golden Boot while playing for Perth Glory:

 Damian Mori – 2001–02 & 2002–03
 Bobby Despotovski – 2005–06
Goal of the Year

The following players have won the A-League Men Goal of the Year award while playing for Perth Glory:

  Andy Keogh – 2020–21

International
This section refers only to caps won while a Perth Glory player.

 First capped player: Gavin Wilkinson, for New Zealand against Oman on 29 September 1996
 First capped player for Australia: Ernie Tapai, against Iran on 22 November 1997
 First player to play in the Asian Cup finals: Chris Ikonomidis, for Australia against Jordan on 6 January 2019

Transfers

Record transfer fees received

Managerial records

 First full-time manager: Gary Marocchi
 Longest-serving manager: Kenny Lowe – Dec 2013 - Apr 2018 (128 matches)
 Shortest-serving manager: Alan Vest – Dec 2005 - Jul 2006 (6 matches)
 Highest win percentage: 68.54% – Mich d'Avray
 Lowest win percentage: 20.93% – Ron Smith

Award winners

Coach of the Year

The following managers have won the Coach of the Year award while managing Perth Glory, either in the National Soccer League or the A-League Men:
  Bernd Stange – 1999–2000
  Mich d'Avray – 2003–04
  Tony Popovic – 2018–19

Team records

Matches

Firsts
 First match: Perth Glory 0–3 Sampdoria, friendly, 31 May 1996
 First National Soccer League match: Perth Glory 1–4 UTS Olympic, 13 October 1996
 First A-League Men match: Perth Glory 0–1 Central Coast Mariners, 26 August 2005
 First Australia Cup match: Newcastle Jets 0–2 Perth Glory, 5 August 2014
 First Asian match: FC Tokyo 1–0 Perth Glory, AFC Champions League group stage, 18 February 2020

Record wins
 Record league win: 6–0 against Canberra Cosmos, National Soccer League, 3 November 1996
 Record Australia Cup win:
 4–1 against St Albans Saints, 23 September 2014
 3–0 against Bentleigh Greens, 11 November 2014

Record defeats
 Record league defeat:
 0–6 against Parramatta Power, National Soccer League, 2 November 2003
 0–6 against Sydney FC, A-League Men, 30 December 2017
 0–6 against Western United, A-League Men, 16 April 2022
 Record Australia Cup defeat:
 0–2 against Melbourne Victory, 7 November 2015
 0–2 against Sydney FC, 30 August 2016
 1–3 against Newcastle Jets, 12 May 2022
 Record Asian defeat: 0–2 against Ulsan Hyundai, AFC Champions League group stage, 27 November 2020

Record consecutive results
 Record consecutive wins: 8, from 7 October 2001 to 1 December 2001
 Record consecutive defeats: 7, from 12 September 2010 to 30 October 2010
 Record consecutive matches without a defeat: 14, from 10 December 2003 to 22 February 2004
 Record consecutive matches without a win: 16, from 23 February 2022 to 30 April 2022

Goals
 Most league goals scored in a season: 73 in 28 matches – 2000–01
 Fewest league goals scored in a season: 20 in 26 matches – 2021–22
 Most league goals conceded in a season: 54 in 30 matches – 2010–11
 Fewest league goals conceded in a season: 22 in 24 matches – 2002–03, 2003–04

Points
 Most points in a season: 
 64 in 34 matches, National Soccer League, 1999–2000
 61 in 30 matches, National Soccer League, 2000–01
 60 in 27 matches, A-League Men, 2018–19
 Fewest points in a season: 18 in 26 matches, A-League Men, 2021–22

Attendances
 Highest home attendance: 56,371 against Sydney FC at Perth Stadium, 2019 A-League Grand Final, 19 May 2019
 Highest home attendance at Perth Oval: 18,067 against South Melbourne, National Soccer League, 15 November 1998
 Lowest home attendance at Perth Oval: 2,577 against Newcastle Jets, A-League Men, 30 March 2022

League record by opponent

References

External links
 Perth Glory Official Website

Perth Glory
Records